The Bulgarian Cup is a Bulgarian annual football competition. It's the country's main cup competition.

Results

Key

Tsar's Cup (1938-1942)

Soviet Army Cup (1946-1982)

Bulgarian Cup (since 1983)

Performance

By Club

By City / Town

A total of 18 clubs have won the Bulgarian Cup, from eight different cities.

Note: Italics indicates defunct clubs.

References

 
Finals
Bulgarian Cup finals
Bulgarian Cup finals